Tajaddin Mehdiyev was the Minister of Defense of Azerbaijan and is the Chairman of Committee for Protection of Rights of Officers in Azerbaijan.

Military career
He graduated from the Baku Higher Combined Arms Command School of the Soviet Army in 1967. He was in the same graduating class as future Armenian defence minister Mikael Harutyunyan.

Minister of Defense of Azerbaijan
Mehdiyev was appointed Minister of Defense of Azerbaijan in December 1991, during the Nagorno-Karabakh conflict, replacing General Valeh Barshadly. In an interview with British journalist Thomas de Waal, Mehdiyev said:

While in office, he personally led an unsuccessful operation in Dashalty where many Azeri soldiers were ambushed and killed. On February 17, 1992 with the fall of Garadaghly village of Khojavend Rayon where more than 70 Azerbaijani civilians died and shortly before the fall of Khojaly, Mehdiyev was officially removed from the post of Minister of Defense. The ministry was then headed briefly by Chief of Staff, Shahin Musayev before Tahir Aliyev took over.

Later years
In 2005, Mehdiyev ran for Azerbaijani parliament from the election district No. 99 of Shamkir Rayon of Azerbaijan but did not get elected. Mehdiyev has been a proponent of big reforms in the way post-career officers are treated while he was the Chairman of Committee for Protection of Rights of Officers. He lobbied changes in salary, health insurance, provision of jobs to members of officers' families due to their relocations and social protection. He was also one of supporters for establishment of Ministry of Defence Industry of Azerbaijan and starting domestic military production. In the last few years, Tajeddin Mehdiyev worked at the Ministry of Defense but was laid off along with other 30 high-ranking officers in 2009 due to ongoing reforms in the ministry.

See also
Azerbaijani Army
Ministers of Defense of Azerbaijan Republic

References

Azerbaijani generals
Azerbaijani military personnel of the Nagorno-Karabakh War
Ministers of Defense of Azerbaijan
Living people
Year of birth missing (living people)